McKim, Mead & White was an American architectural firm that came to define architectural practice, urbanism, and the ideals of the American Renaissance in fin de siècle New York. The firm's founding partners Charles Follen McKim (1847–1909), William Rutherford Mead (1846–1928) and Stanford White (1853–1906) were giants in the architecture of their time, and remain important as innovators and leaders in the development of modern architecture worldwide. They formed a school of classically trained, technologically skilled designers who practiced well into the mid-twentieth century. According to Robert A. M. Stern, only Frank Lloyd Wright was more important to the identity and character of modern American architecture.   

The firm's New York City buildings include Manhattan's former Pennsylvania Station, the Brooklyn Museum, and the main campus of Columbia University. Elsewhere in New York State and New England, the firm designed college, library, school and other buildings such as the Boston Public Library, Walker Art Building at Bowdoin College, the Garden City campus of Adelphi University and the Rhode Island State House. In Washington, D.C., the firm renovated the West and East Wings of the White House, and designed Roosevelt Hall on Fort Lesley J. McNair and the National Museum of American History. Across the United States, the firm designed buildings in Illinois, Kentucky, Michigan, Ohio, Pennsylvania, Tennessee, Washington and Wisconsin. Other examples are in Canada, Cuba and Italy. The scope and breadth of their achievement is astounding, considering that many of the technologies and strategies they employed were nascent or non-existent when they began working in the 1880s.

Early years

Charles McKim was the son of a prominent Quaker abolitionist who grew up in West Orange, New Jersey. He attended Harvard College and went to Paris to attend the École des Beaux-Arts, a leading training ground for Americans. William Rutherford Mead, a cousin of president Rutherford B. Hayes, went to Amherst College and trained with Russell Sturgis in Boston. The two formed a partnership with William Bigelow in New York in 1877.

White was born in New York City, the son of Shakespearean scholar Richard Grant White and Alexina Black Mease (1830–1921). His father was a dandy and Anglophile with no money, but a great many connections in New York's art world, including painter John LaFarge, Louis Comfort Tiffany and Frederick Law Olmsted.

White had no formal architectural training; he began his career at the age of 18 as the principal assistant to Henry Hobson Richardson, the most important American architect of the day and creator of a style recognized today as "Richardsonian Romanesque". He remained with Richardson for six years, playing a major role in the design of the William Watts Sherman House in Newport, Rhode Island, an important Shingle Style work.

White joined the partnership in 1879, and quickly became known as the artistic leader of the firm. McKim's connections helped secure early commissions, while Mead served as the managing partner. Their work applied the principles of Beaux-Arts architecture, with its classical design traditions and training in drawing and proportion, and the related City Beautiful movement after 1893. The designers quickly found wealthy and influential clients amidst the bustle and economic vigor of metropolitan New York.

Initially the firm distinguished itself with innovative Shingle Style summer houses such as Victor Newcomb's house in Elberon, New Jersey (1880–1881), the Isaac Bell House in Newport, Rhode Island (1883), and Joseph Choate's house "Naumkeag" in Lenox, Massachusetts (1885-88). Their status rose when McKim was asked to design the Boston Public Library in 1887, ensuring a new group of institutional clients following its successful completion in 1895. The firm had begun to use classical sources from Modern French, Renaissance and even Roman buildings as sources of inspiration for daring new work. 

In 1877 White and McKim led their partners on a "sketching tour" of New England, visiting many of the key houses of Puritan leaders and early masterpieces of the colonial period. Their work began to incorporate influences from these buildings, contributing to a revival of interest in American art and architecture: The Colonial Revival.

The H.A.C. Taylor house in Newport (1882–1886) was the first of their designs to use overt quotations from colonial buildings, but many would follow. A less successful but daring variation of a formal Georgian plan was White's house for Commodore William Edgar, also in Newport (1884-86). Rather than traditional red brick or the pink pressed masonry of the Bell house, White tried a tawny, almost brown color, leaving the building neither fish nor fowl. 

The partners added talented designers and associates as the 1890s loomed, with Thomas Hastings, John Carrère, Henry Bacon and Joseph M. Wells on the payroll in their expanding office. With a larger staff, each partner could have a "studio" of designers at his disposal, rather like the organization of a modern design firm. This increased their capacity for doing bigger and bigger jobs, such as the design of entire college campuses for Columbia and New York Universities, and a massive entertainment complex at Madison Square Garden. They were entering a new phase of outstanding productivity and achievements.

Flowering and major works

McKim, Mead and White gained prominence as a cultural and artistic force through their construction of Madison Square Garden. White secured the job from the Vanderbilt family, and the other partners brought former clients into the project as investors. The extraordinary building opened its doors in 1890. What had once been a dilapidated arena for horse shows was now a multi-purpose entertainment palace, with a larger arena, a theater, apartments in a Spanish style tower, restaurants, and a roof garden with views both uptown and downtown from 34th Street. White's masterpiece was a testament to his creative imagination, and his taste for the pleasures of city life.

The architects paved the way for many subsequent colleagues by fraternizing with the rich in a number of other settings similar to The Garden, enhancing their social status during the Progressive Era. McKim, Mead and White designed not only the Century Association building (1891), but also many other clubs around Manhattan: the Colony Club, the Metropolitan Club, the Harmonie Club, and the University Club of New York. 

Though White's subsequent life was plagued by scandals, and McKim's by depression and the loss of his second wife, the firm continued to produce magnificent and varied work in New York and abroad. They worked for the titans of industry, transportation and banking, designing not only classical buildings (the New York Herald Building, Morgan Library, Villard Houses, and Rhode Island State Capitol), but also planning factory towns (Echota, near Niagara Falls, New York; Roanoke Rapids, North Carolina; and Naugatuck, Connecticut), and working on university campuses (the University of Virginia, Harvard, Adelphi University and Columbia). The magnificent Low Library (1897) at Columbia was similar to Thomas Jefferson's at the University of Virginia, where White added an academic building on the other side of the Lawn.

Some of their later, classical country houses also enhanced their reputation with wealthy oligarchs and critics alike. The Frederick Vanderbilt mansion (1895–1898) at Hyde Park, New York and White's "Rosecliff" for Tessie Oelrichs (1898–1902) in Newport were elegant venues for the society chronicled by Edith Wharton and Henry James. Newly-wealthy Americans were seeking the right spouses for their sons and daughters, among them idle aristocrats from European families with dwindling financial resources. When called for, the firm could also deliver a house-full of continental antiques and works of art, many acquired by Stanford White from dealers abroad. The Clarence McKay house in Roslyn, New York, was probably the most opulent of these flights of fancy. Though many are gone, some now serve new uses, such as "Florham", in Madison, New Jersey (1897–1900), now the home of Fairleigh Dickinson University.

New York's enormous Penn Station (1906–1910) was the firm's crowning achievement, reflecting not only its commitment to new technological advances, but also to architectural history stretching back to Greek and Roman times. McKim, Mead & White also designed the General Post Office Building across from Penn Station at the same time, part of which became the new Amtrak station in 2021. The original Penn Station was demolished in 1963–1964 and replaced with a newer Madison Square Garden, in spite of large opposition to the move. One of the firm's last major works in the city was the Manhattan Municipal Building (1906–1913) adjacent to City Hall, built following the deaths of both White (1906) and McKim (1909) and the financial collapse of the original partnership.

Later partnerships
The firm retained its name long after the deaths of founding partners White (1906), McKim (1909), and Mead (1928). The major partners became William M. Kendall and Lawrence Grant White, Stanford's son. Among the firm's final works under the name McKim, Mead & White was the National Museum of American History in Washington, D.C. Designed primarily by partner James Kellum Smith, it opened in 1964. Smith died in 1961, and the firm was soon renamed Steinmann, Cain and White. In 1971, it became Walker O. Cain and Associates.

Selected works

New York City

New England and New York State

New Jersey

Washington, D.C.

Other U.S. locations

Other countries

Notable architects who worked for McKim, Mead & White
 Henry Bacon – worked at the firm from about 1886 through 1897; left with fellow employee James Brite to open their own office.
 William A. Boring – worked at the firm in 1890 before forming a separate partnership with Edward Lippincott Tilton.
 Charles Lewis Bowman – a draftsman at the firm until 1922, noted for his large number of private residences throughout Westchester County, New York including Bronxville, Pelham Manor, Mamaroneck and New Rochelle.
 A. Page Brown – worked with the firm beginning in the 1880s; went to California, where he was known for the San Francisco Ferry Building.
 Walker O. Cain – worked at the firm; he took it over in 1961 and renamed it several times.
 J.E.R. Carpenter – worked at the firm for several years before designing much of upper Fifth and Park Avenues, including 907 Fifth Avenue, 825 Fifth Avenue, 625 Park Avenue, 550 Park Avenue and the Lincoln Building on 42nd Street.
 John Merven Carrère (1858–1911) – worked with McKim, Mead & White from 1883 through 1885, then joined Thomas Hastings to form the firm Carrère and Hastings.
 Thomas Harlan Ellett (1880–1951)
 Cass Gilbert – worked with the firm until 1882, when he went to work with James Knox Taylor; later designed many notable structures, among them the George Washington Bridge and the Woolworth Building.
 Arthur Loomis Harmon – later of Shreve, Lamb and Harmon.
 Thomas Hastings (1860–1929) – of Carrère and Hastings, worked with McKim, Mead & White from 1883 through 1885.
 John Galen Howard (1864–1931)
 John Mead Howells (1868–1959)
 William Mitchell Kendall (1856–1941) – worked with the firm from 1882 until his death.
 Harrie T. Lindeberg – started at the firm in 1895 as an assistant to Stanford White and remained with the firm until White's death in 1906.
 Austin W. Lord – worked with the firm in 1890–1894 on designs for Brooklyn Museum of Arts and Sciences, the Metropolitan Club and buildings at Columbia University
 Harold Van Buren Magonigle (1867–1935)
 Albert Randolph Ross
 Philip Sawyer (1868–1949)
 James Kellum Smith (1893–1961) – a member of the firm from 1924 to 1961; full partner in 1929, and the last surviving partner of MM&W. He primarily designed academic buildings, but his last major work was the National Museum of American History.
 Egerton Swartwout of Tracy and Swartwout – both Tracy and Swartwout worked together for the firm on multiple projects prior to starting their own practice.
 Edward Lippincott Tilton – helped design the Boston Public Library in 1890 before leaving with Boring.
 Robert von Ezdorf – took over much of the firm's business after White's death.
 Joseph Morrill Wells (1853–1890) –  worked as firm's first Chief Draftsman from 1879 to 1890; often considered to be the firm's "fourth partner", and largely responsible for its Renaissance Revival designs in the 1880s.
 William M. Whidden – worked at the firm from at least 1882 until 1888; projects included the Tacoma and Portland hotels in Washington and Oregon, respectively; moved to Portland, Oregon, in 1888 to finish the hotel and established his own firm with Ion Lewis
 York and Sawyer – Edward York (1863–1928) and Philip Sawyer (1868–1949) worked together for the firm before starting their own partnership in 1898.

References

Citations

General and cited bibliography 
 Baker, Paul R. (1989). Stanny: The Gilded Life of Stanford White. New York: Free Press. .
 Broderick, Mosette (2010). Triumvirate: McKim, Mead & White: Art, Architecture, Scandal, and Class in America's Gilded Age. New York: Knopf. .
 McKim, Mead & White (1915–1920). A Monograph of the Work of McKim, Mead & White, 1879–1915, 4 vols. New York: Architectural Book Publishing Co.
 Reprinted as The Architecture of McKim, Mead & White in Photographs, Plans and Elevations, with an introduction by Richard Guy Wilson. New York: Dover Publications, 1990. .
 Roth, Leland M. (September 1, 1978). The Architecture of McKim, Mead & White, 1870–1920: A Building List. Garland Reference Library of the Humanities. Garland Publishing. .
 Roth, Leland M. (October 1985). McKim, Mead and White, Architects (First edition). Harper & Row. .

External links

 McKim, Mead & White: Selected Works 1879 to 1915, published by Princeton Architectural Press, 2018
 McKim, Mead & White in Buffalo
 McKim, Mead & White Architectural Records Collection at the New-York Historical Society
 Brooklyn Museum Building Online Exhibition
 McKim, Mead & White architectural records and drawings, c. 1879–1958, held by the Avery Architectural and Fine Arts Library, Columbia University

 
1872 establishments in New York (state)
19th-century American architects
20th-century American architects
American neoclassical architects
Architects of the Boston Public Library
Beaux Arts architects
Defunct architecture firms based in New York City
Historicist architects
American railway architects